Quarter Place is a historic home located at Lothian in Anne Arundel County, Maryland, United States.  It was built in 1860 and is a -story Gothic Revival–style frame dwelling.  It consists of a main block with a 2-story rear wing.  The main block is three bays wide with a central entrance and features a central cross-gable roof.

It was listed on the National Register of Historic Places in 2009.

References

External links
, at Maryland Historical Trust

Houses on the National Register of Historic Places in Maryland
Houses in Anne Arundel County, Maryland
Gothic Revival architecture in Maryland
Houses completed in 1860
National Register of Historic Places in Anne Arundel County, Maryland
1860 establishments in Maryland